Terry Shannon (born 12 June 1962) is an Irish Fianna Fáil politician and a former Lord Mayor of Cork. He has served on Cork City Council since 1999, representing the South East electoral area. Prior to his election to the council, Shannon was a member of the Fianna Fáil National Youth Committee, chairperson of Cork North Central Ógra, and election agent to TD Micheál Martin. Shannon topped the poll in his first city council election with a 14.2% share of the vote. He has been re-elected four times, in 2004, 2009, 2014 and 2019. He was elected to the office of Lord Mayor on 24 June 2011, having previously served as Deputy Lord Mayor in 2009.

References

Living people
Fianna Fáil politicians
Local councillors in Cork (city)
Lord Mayors of Cork
1962 births